MASSIVE (Multiple Agent Simulation System in Virtual Environment) is considered, by industry professionals, to be a high-end computer animation and artificial intelligence software package used for generating crowd-related visual effects for film and television.

Simple Overview
Massive is a software package developed by Stephen Regelous for use in the visual effects industry. It's primary feature is its ability to rapidly create large groups of agents that can act as individuals, each with their own unique behaviors and actions. This is opposed to content creators spending large amounts of time individually animating or programming the agents by hand. In other words, remember that movie when those two extremely large armies fought against each other? Remember how easy it was to believe you were watching real people battle it out and how epic it was? That's because the visual effects artists used the M.A.S.S.I.V.E software package. Without using Massive the producers would have to either hire hundreds of more artists or add years to the production time. Both of which would add tremendous cost to the production.

Extended Overview 
Through the use of fuzzy logic, the software enables every agent to respond individually to its surroundings, including other agents. These reactions affect the agent's behavior, changing how they act by controlling pre-recorded animation clips. Blending between such clips creates characters that move, act, and react realistically. These pre-recorded animations can come from motion-capture sessions or they can be hand-animated in other 3D animation software packages.

In addition to the artificial intelligence abilities of Massive, there are numerous other features, including cloth simulation, rigid body dynamics and graphics processing unit (GPU) based hardware rendering. Massive Software has also created several pre-built agents ready to perform certain tasks, such as stadium crowd agents, rioting 'mayhem' agents and simple agents who walk around and talk to each other.

History
Massive was originally developed in Wellington, New Zealand. Peter Jackson, the director of the Lord of the Rings films (2001–2003), required software that allowed armies of hundreds of thousands of soldiers to fight, a problem that had not been solved in film-making before. Stephen Regelous created Massive to allow Wētā FX to generate many of the award-winning visual effects, particularly the battle sequences, for the Lord of the Rings films. Since then, it has developed into a complete product and has been licensed by a number of other visual effects houses.

Significant Examples 
Massive has been used in many productions, both commercials and feature-length films, small-scale and large.

Some significant examples include:
The Lord of the Rings
Rise of the Planet of the Apes
Avatar
The Chronicles of Narnia: The Lion, the Witch and the Wardrobe
King Kong (Jackson, 2005)
Radiohead - Go To Sleep (Music Video)
Flags of our Fathers (besides battle and crowd scenes, even shots of seacraft crossing the Pacific were created with Massive)
Carlton Draught: Big Ad
Mountain, a television commercial for the PlayStation 2 console
I, Robot
Category 7: The End of the World
Blades of Glory
Eragon
The Mummy: Tomb of the Dragon Emperor
Happy Feet
300
The Ant Bully (the first film to use computer animated characters as Massive agents rather than motion capture.  Also first to use facial animation within Massive)
Buffy ("Chosen")
Doctor Who ("Partners in Crime")
Changeling
Speed Racer (Car A.I. and crowds)
WALL-E
Up
Life of Pi (Both the flying fish and meerkat sequences were created with the help of Massive)
The Hobbit
Dawn of the Planet of the Apes
World War Z
Game of Thrones
Black Panther
Aquaman
Avengers: Endgame

See also
Crowd simulation
Multi-agent system
Fuzzy logic
Emergence
 Lightwave 3D
 Electric Image Animation System
 Cinema 4D
 Modo
 Blender

External links

Official site of Wētā FX

3D graphics software
Animation software
Agent-based model
3D computer graphics software for Linux
Proprietary commercial software for Linux
Special effects
Visual effects
Visual effects software